Decision may refer to:

Law and politics
Judgment (law), as the outcome of a legal case
Landmark decision, the outcome of a case that sets a legal precedent
Per curiam decision, by a court with multiple judges

Books
Decision (novel), a 1983 political novel by Allen Drury
The Decision (novel), a 1998 book in the Animorphs series

Sports
Decision (baseball), a statistical credit earned by a baseball pitcher
Decisions in combat sports
Decisions (professional wrestling), by which a wrestler scores a point against his opponent

Film and TV
Decision (TV series), an American anthology TV series
The Decision (play), by the 20th-century German dramatist Bertolt Brecht
The Decision (TV special), in which NBA player LeBron James announced that he would switch teams
"The Decision" (song), by English indie rock band Young Knives

Music

Albums
Decisions (George Adams and Don Pullen album), 1984
Decisions (The Winans album), 1987

Songs
"The Decision" (song), by English indie rock band Young Knives 2005
"Decisions" (song), by Borgore featuring Miley Cyrus
"Decisions", song by The Expression Tom Haran	1983
"Decisions", song by	Van McCoy	1979
"Decision", a song by Busta Rhymes from the album Back on My B.S.

Other
Decision making
Decision support system
Decision theory

See also
Decision cycle
Decision matrix
Decision tree
Decision-making software
Decisional balance sheet
Design rationale
Discernment
Judgment
Shared decision-making
Decide (disambiguation)
Decidable (disambiguation)
Indecision (disambiguation)